Teber (Tabar)  Ottoman  Turkish iron axe ,   Scythians axe, Teber or Tabar word etymological root is sumerian word "Tab" tab [BURN] (13x: Old Babylonian, unknown) wr. tab; tab2 "to burn, fire; to dye (red); to brand, mark" Akk. hamāţu; šamātu; şarāpu.    . Assurians use "tab" > tab [FLATTEN] V/t (19x) Ur III, Old Babylonian, Neo-Assyrian wr. tab; tab-tab "to flatten  .   ':   "      Tabar/Teber should be raletive Turkish word  Temür/Timur (İron)   temür   . 

Selim Teber (born 1981)  , German footballer of Turkish ancestry
Ergün Teber (born 1985), Turkish footballer
Mine Teber (born 1961), Turkish-Cypriot actress

See also
Heber (given name)
Taber (surname)
Tener